Papyrus 13, designated by siglum 𝔓13 or P13 in the Gregory-Aland numbering, is a fragmented manuscript of the New Testament in Greek. It was copied on papyrus in the 3rd century at approximately 225-250 CE.

Description 

Papyrus 13 was discovered by Bernard Grenfell and Arthur Hunt in Oxyrhynchus, Egypt. It is currently housed at the British Library, Inv. Nr. 1532, and Egyptian Museum, SR 3796 25/1/55/2 (11), or PSI 1292.

The surviving text is twelve columns, of 23 to 27 lines each, from a scroll. This is all from the Epistle to the Hebrews, namely 2:14-5:5; 10:8-22; 10:29-11:13; 11:28-12:17. Its presence of pagination 47-50 means that Hebrews was preceded by only one book in the original scroll, likely the Epistle to the Romans as in Papyrus 46. It is the largest papyrus manuscript of the New Testament outside the Chester Beatty Papyri.

It was written on the back of a papyrus containing the Epitome of Livy and some scholars think the manuscript was possibly brought to Egypt by a Roman official and left behind when he left his post.

It has errors of itacism (ι and ει, ε and αι, υ and οι).

Text 
Papyrus 13 is a representative of the Alexandrian text-type. Aland placed it in Category I.

It bears strong textual affinity with Codex Vaticanus, and also has an 80% agreement with Papyrus 46. It has numerous distinctive readings.

Papyrus 13 is written recto-verso, with the verso (back) containing Hebrews and the recto (front) containing part of Livy's History of Rome, dated to around 200 AD.

See also 
 List of New Testament papyri
 Oxyrhynchus papyri
 Papyrus 1
 Papyrus 115
 Papyrus Oxyrhynchus 656
 Papyrus Oxyrhynchus 658

References

Further reading 
 
 Vittorio Bartoletti and M. Norsi, Papiri greci e latini della Società Italiana, vol. 12 (1951), p. 209-210 (PSI 1292).

External links 
 Aland, K and Aland, B (1995), The Text of the New Testament, p. 97, Trans. Rhodes, EF, Pub. Wm. B. Eerdmans. 
 Robert B. Waltz. 'NT Manuscripts: Papyri, Papyri P13.' Image of P13

3rd-century biblical manuscripts
New Testament papyri
657
Early Greek manuscripts of the New Testament
Epistle to the Hebrews papyri